= Deafness in the Netherlands =

Deaf and hard-of-hearing people in the Netherlands use Sign Language of the Netherlands (NGT), a sign language with about 13,000 users that was officially recognized in 2021. Deaf education dates back to 1790, when Henri Daniel Guyot founded the first deaf school in Groningen. The Netherlands ratified the UN Convention on the Rights of Persons with Disabilities in 2016, though in 2024 the CRPD Committee pointed to remaining problems such as a shortage of NGT interpreters, limiting on interpreting hours and inaccessible schools and legal proceedings. Newborn hearing screening is free, takes place at home, and reached more than 99% of eligible children, and families of children with hearing loss can access early intervention services reimbursed by health insurance. In healthcare, studies have documented communication barriers between deaf patients and general practitioners, low us of professional interpreters, and added difficulties during the COVID-19 pandemic. Remote interpreting services and NGT translation tools have developed since then.

== Human and Civil Rights ==
The Netherlands ratified the UN Convention on the Rights of Persons with Disabilities (CRPD) on 14 June 2016 for the European part of the country, and the Convention entered into force for the Netherlands on 14 July 2016. At ratification, the Netherlands made declarations on seven articles. In 2024, the CRPD Committee recommended withdrawing these declarations. The government has also decided to ratify the Optional Protocol but had not finished the process, and the Committee recommended finishing it quickly. Several CRPD articles are also especially important, including ones that cover sign languages as languages (article 2), sign language interpreters (article 9), recognition of sign languages (article 21), sign language learning in education (article 24), and Deaf cultural and linguistic identity (article 30). The Netherlands recognized Dutch Sign Language, also known as Sign Language of the Netherlands (NGT), as an official language in 2021. A study conducted in 2023 by Joni Oyserman found that Deaf people have a legal right to interpreters in criminal proceedings, but interpreters are often not used in practice. This was linked to limited awareness of Deaf culture, interpreter placement, gaps in the law, as well as little participation by the Deaf. There is also a shortage of NGT interpreters, and the Employee Insurance Agency has placed limits on interpreting hours. Mainstream schools often do not have accommodations for deaf students, and legal proceedings are not always accessible for people with hearing impairments. The Committee also noted that data on asylum seekers and refugees with disabilities are not collected in a systematic way, but does not mention Deaf people specifically.

== Sign Language of the Netherlands ==
The main sign language in the Netherlands is "Sign Language of the Netherlands," with alternate names including Dutch Sign Language, NGT, Nederlandse Gebarentaal, and SLN. NGT is a Deaf Community sign language, used in Deaf schools and associations. Deaf schools opened in the Netherlands int eh 18th century, with the first one being founded by Henri Daniel Guyot in Groningen in 1790. Sign language was used in education until 1915, where it was banned in all deaf school till 1980. Deaf people kept using NGT outside of school so the language survived, but it developed regional and generational differences. After the oral period, schools used signed Dutch, and in 1995 they began using a bilingual approach. There are about 13,000 users, including first and second language users. With a language status of 5 on Ethnologue, meaning developing, NGT is used often in Deaf schools and associations. After years of seeking recognition, Parliament passed a law recognizing NGT in September 2020, and the senate approved it on 13 October 2020. In addition to NGT, there are 5 dialects associated with the deaf schools, and another one for Deaf elderly people. NGT uses a one-handed fingerspelling system similar to that of ASL or French Sign Language. NGT is classified in the French Sign Language family. It has no written form, but it has a standard vocabulary of signs kept by the Dutch Sign Center. There are lots of language development activities including television, theater, and a dictionary. As of 2014, there were 400 working interpreters, a sign center that develops teaching materials, and research at the University of Amsterdam and Radboud University. The Dutch Sign Center also supports teaching and learning NGT.

== Hearing Screening ==
According to Prenatal and Neonatal screening, the Netherlands was among the first countries to achieve national coverage for newborn hearing screening, with a high participation rate and a low rate of referral to audiology centers. The program was introduced in child Healthcare between 2002 and 2006 by the NSDSK and TNO. The screening is performed at home rather than in a hospital, and it is financed from local authority funds. The most recent national report covers children born in 2024. In that year, 162,660 children were eligible for screening and 99.3% took part in the first round. Screening has up to three rounds, with 2 using an ear test (OAE), and the third using a brain response test. Children who do not pass all three rounds are referred to an audiology center. Referrals to audiology centers decreased from 5-6% with the earlier nine month test to under 0.3% with newborn screening. A study of 2015-2019 results included 99.7% of 833,318 eligible children took part, and 0.3% were referred for diagnosis. The study found a prevalence of permanent hearing loss of 1.23 per 1,000 children, and 87.5% of children with hearing loss were diagnosed within three months. Conducted within the first couple days after the child's birth, hearing screening is free. About 160,000-170,000 children are screened every year, with around 200 of them later getting a diagnosis of unilateral or bilateral hearing loss.

== Early Intervention ==
In the Netherlands, families of children with moderate to severe hearing loss in both ears are typically advised by an audiology center to register with an early treatment service following diagnosis. There is no fixed age limit for these services. Most are directed at children aged 0–6, though older children and their families may also receive support. The services are reimbursed by health insurance, and are not subject to the deductible. The range and delivery of services vary by region. Early treatment includes support related to hearing technology. Hearing aids are a central part of early intervention for children with permanent hearing loss in the Netherlands. In most children with bilateral hearing loss, intervention begins with hearing aid fitting. Child are initially fitted with analog or digital behind the ear hearing aids or bone anchored hearing aids. Under Dutch healthcare legislation, children with a hearing loss of at least 35-40 dB are eligible for intervention by specialist centers, also called early intervention centers. Home guidance covers explanations of the audiogram, hearing aids, and cochlear implants, as well as assisting in choosing a CI team and preparing for the CI surgery. Programs for learning sign language before school entry are also offered. These include sign skills training for family members, grandparents, and babysitters. There are also sign language courses offered for family members, and a separate one for grandparents. Specialized treatment groups for toddlers and preschoolers support language, communication, and social development through spoken language or gestures. There is also guidance provided for childcare and playgroup staff on communication and the use of gestures. Early intervention has become more accessible for children with moderate hearing loss and there have also been improvements in hearing aid quality.

== Healthcare ==
A 2009 study by Smeijers and Pfau examined communication between deaf and hard-of-hearing patients and their general practitioners in the Netherlands. They reported that GPs often appeared to assume deaf people had no difficulty understanding written information and noted that older deaf people who were deaf from a young age did not always have the opportunity to learn to read and write proficiently, which they linked to the strictly oral education used in Dutch deaf schools for many years. In the study, 30% of GPs identified spoke Dutch as the first language of a patient who reported NGT, and only one GP was aware of Deaf culture and NGT. Of the patients surveyed, 74% reported never bringing a professional interpreter to GP visits. It was also noted that arranging an interpreter was usually the patient's responsibility, and that patients cited same-day appointments and a limited number of governments funded interpreter hours.

=== Telehealth ===
Tolkcontact, an organization providing services for deaf and hard-of-hearing people in the Netherlands, offers several remote communication services. Its service lets staff at a desk or reception connect to an NGT interpreter by video with one button, and its Teletolk service has interpreters translate between NGT and text or speech for phone calls. Its app lets deaf users request a remote NGT interpreter without an appointment, seven days a week between 7:00 and 22:00 (10 p.m.). Tolkcontact also arranges in-person interpreters through a network of more than 700 NGT and written-text interpreters.

=== Deaf Mental Healthcare ===
A 2005 study by Theo van Eldik surveyed 202 deaf and hard-of-hearing Dutch youth aged 11 to 18 using an adapted Youth Self Report questionnaire. About 37% scored in the borderline or clinical range for overall problems compared with 17% in a hearing comparison sample and 42% did so for internalizing problems such as anxiety and depression, also compared with 17%. Van Eldik wrote that internalizing problems are harder for others to recognize because of communication difficulties, limited awareness, and masking by the young person. It was also reported that the schools consulted generally had no protocols or measures to screen young people for mental health problems and called for more frequent screening.

=== COVID-19 ===
The COVID-19 pandemic created additional communication barriers for deaf patients in the Netherlands. Researchers at the University of Amsterdam reported that sign language interpreters could often not enter hospitals and that face masks made lipreading impossible. A 2020 project led by Floris Roelofsen studied the experiences and communication needs of deaf patients during the pandemic. Participants reported that masks prevented them from understanding healthcare workers, that interpreter use was more limited, and that they felt healthcare workers did not know how to communicate with them. The project also found appreciation for accessible information such as subtitling or translation into NGT, while also saying that the quality of these provisions varied and needed to be better guaranteed. In response to this, a team including Smeijers developed a system that allows healthcare professionals to translate sentences frequently used in the diagnosis and treatment of Covid 19 into NGT, displayed through videos and animations.
